Ramla Right Battery, also known as Gironda Battery or Nadur Battery, was an artillery battery in Ramla Bay, limits of Nadur on the island of Gozo, Malta. It was built by the Order of Saint John in 1715–1716 as one of a series of coastal fortifications around the Maltese Islands. The battery now lies in ruins.

History
Ramla Right Battery was built in 1715–1716 as part of the first building programme of coastal batteries in Malta. It was one of several fortifications in Ramla Bay, which also included Ramla Left Battery on the opposite side of the bay and Ramla Redoubt in the centre. These were all linked together by an entrenchment wall. Ramla Bay was further defended by Marsalforn Tower on the plateau above the bay, and an underwater barrier to prevent enemy ships from landing within the bay.

The battery had a semi-circular parapet with six embrasures, with a blockhouse at the rear. A fougasse was also dug on the shore close to the battery, and it still exists.

The battery saw use during the French invasion of Malta in 1798, when it fired on the approaching French fleet.

Present day
Today, only some remains of the battery's blockhouse survive. These remains, along with the rest of Ramla Bay, are managed by the Gaia Foundation.

References

External links
National Inventory of the Cultural Property of the Maltese Islands

Batteries in Malta
Hospitaller fortifications in Malta
Military installations established in 1715
Ruins in Malta
Nadur
Limestone buildings in Malta
National Inventory of the Cultural Property of the Maltese Islands
18th-century fortifications
1715 establishments in Malta
18th Century military history of Malta